Acaena dumicola is a species of perennial plant found only in scrubby and rocky habitats at altitudes of between 300 and 1200 m in the South Island of New Zealand.

This is a low plant distinctive for its prostrate branches each ending in three bluish-green leaflets. The margins of these leaflets are minutely toothed, the teeth often being reddish brown. It often grows as a ground cover plant beneath thickets of Matagouri (Discaria toumatou). Flowering occurs in November and December with fruit being produced in January.

References

External links

dumicola
Flora of New Zealand
Plants described in 1985